Tiago Henrique de Oliveira Camilo (born 24 May 1982) is a judoka from Brazil, who won the silver medal in the lightweight (−73 kg) division at the 2000 Summer Olympics. He also won a gold medal at the 2007 World Judo Championships, and was the third Brazilian to become a world champion in judo, after João Derly and Luciano Correa. At the 2008 Summer Olympics he won a bronze medal in the −81 kg category. At the 2012 Olympic Games, he lost the bronze medal match to Ilias Iliadis in the −90 kg weight division.

References

External links

 

1982 births
Living people
Judoka at the 2000 Summer Olympics
Judoka at the 2008 Summer Olympics
Judoka at the 2012 Summer Olympics
Judoka at the 2016 Summer Olympics
Judoka at the 2003 Pan American Games
Judoka at the 2007 Pan American Games
Judoka at the 2011 Pan American Games
Olympic judoka of Brazil
Olympic silver medalists for Brazil
Olympic bronze medalists for Brazil
Olympic medalists in judo
World judo champions
Medalists at the 2008 Summer Olympics
Brazilian male judoka
Pan American Games gold medalists for Brazil
Medalists at the 2000 Summer Olympics
Pan American Games medalists in judo
Judoka at the 2015 Pan American Games
Medalists at the 2007 Pan American Games
Medalists at the 2011 Pan American Games
Medalists at the 2015 Pan American Games
Sportspeople from São Paulo (state)
20th-century Brazilian people
21st-century Brazilian people
People from Tupã, São Paulo